Paul Malmont (born 4 March 1966) is an American author who has specialized in books considering the style and tropes of popular fiction of the past, making the writers of that popular fiction the heroes and protagonists of his own work.

As a marketing executive for DC he produced numerous documentaries and projects celebrating the legacy of the company’s superheroes including 450 episodes of the pop culture news and entertainment program, DC Daily.

Life
He was born in Washington, D.C.
In his literary debut The Chinatown Death Cloud Peril, published in 2007, Malmont created a 1930s pulp story that featured Walter Gibson (creator of the Shadow), Lester Dent (creator of Doc Savage) and Scientology founder L. Ron Hubbard.

Malmont's second book, Jack London in Paradise (2009) was a historical novel about Jack London,. His third book, a sequel to his first novel, was The Astounding, the Amazing, and the Unknown (2011) which featured as its protagonists science-fiction authors Robert Heinlein and Isaac Asimov. In 2010, Malmont wrote the first four issues of DC Comics' Doc Savage comic book with artist Howard Porter and covers by artist J.G. Jones.

Malmont also made a short film, "The King of the Magicians", that was a commendation winner at the UK Festival of Fantastic Films and premiered at the Los Angeles International Film Festival.

Malmont was a senior copywriter and creative director at the advertising agency R/GA in New York City, and since 2014 he has lived in California and worked at DC as Executive Director of Video Strategy and Content.

Works 
 The Chinatown Death Cloud Peril (2007)
 Jack London in Paradise (2009)
 Doc Savage #1-4 (2010)
 The Astounding, the Amazing, and the Unknown (2011)

References

External links
 Paul Malmont's website
 Paul Malmont on IMDB
 Interview with Paul Malmont - Mulhollandbooks.com
 Interview with Paul Malmont on Jack London in Paradise
 Article by Paul Malmont - The Quivering Pen

Reviews
 Review of The Astounding, the Amazing, and the Unknown - Washington Post
 Review of The Astounding, the Amazing, and the Unknown - Library Journal
 Review of The Astounding, the Amazing, and the Unknown - A/V Club
 Review of Jack London in Paradise - USA Today

Living people
21st-century American novelists
American male novelists
American comics writers
21st-century American male writers
1966 births